Ellen Elizabeth Kirkman is professor of mathematics at Wake Forest University. Her research interests include noncommutative algebra, representation theory, and homological algebra.

Education
She received her Ph.D. in Mathematics and M.A. in Statistics from Michigan State University in 1975.
Her doctoral dissertation, On the Characterization of Inertial Coefficient Rings, was supervised by Edward C. Ingraham.

Professional activities
Kirkman is on the board of directors of  Enhancing Diversity in Graduate Education (EDGE), a program to help women pursuing studies in the mathematical sciences.  From 2012 - 2020 she served as treasurer of the Association for Women in Mathematics (AWM).

Kirkman's professional activities include serving on the American Mathematical Society (AMS) Nominating Committee 2009–11, as a Mathematical Association of America (MAA) Governor 2006–8, on the Joint Data Committee of AMS-ASA-MAA-IMS-SIAM (2000– 2007 and 2009–present) and directing the CBMS 2010 survey of undergraduate mathematical sciences programs. She is an associate editor of Communications in Algebra.

Kirkman served as treasurer and was on the Executive Committee of the Association for Women in Mathematics from 2012–2020.

Recognition
In 2012, Kirkman became a fellow of the American Mathematical Society.
She is part of the 2019 class of fellows of the Association for Women in Mathematics.
She has also received service awards from Wake Forest University and the Southeastern Section of the MAA. She received the 2022 AWM Service Award "for her eight years of service (2012 – 2020) as AWM Treasurer and Chair of the Financial Oversight and Investment Committee, for her service on the Membership Portfolio Committee, and for her role as an organizer and a research leader in the WINART (Women in Noncommutative Algebra and Representation Theory) Research Network."

References

External links

Living people
20th-century American mathematicians
21st-century American mathematicians
American women mathematicians
Michigan State University alumni
Wake Forest University faculty
Fellows of the American Mathematical Society
Fellows of the Association for Women in Mathematics
Algebraists
20th-century women mathematicians
21st-century women mathematicians
Year of birth missing (living people)
20th-century American women
21st-century American women